Bhagwanpur Hat is a community development block and a town in Siwan district, in Bihar state of India. It is one of the six blocks that comprise Maharajganj Subdivision. The headquarter of the block is at Bhagwanpur Hat town.

The block is divided into many gram panchayats (village councils) and villages.

Gram panchayats
Gram panchayats of Bhagwanpur Hat block in Maharajganj Subdivision, Siwan district:.

Balahan arazi
Bansohi
Barka gaon
Bhikhampur
Bilaspur
Bithuna
Brahmasthan
Gopalpur
Kauria
Kherwa
Mahamada
Mahamadpur
Mirjumala
Morakhas
Sagar Sultanpur dakshin
Sagar Sultanpur uttar
Sahasaraon
Sankarpur
Saraya parauli
Sondhani

See also
Maharajganj Subdivision
Administration in Bihar
(MAKHDUMPUR IN SIWAN BIHAR))

References

Community development blocks in Siwan district